The lançados (literally, the thrown out ones or the cast out ones) were settlers and adventurers of Portuguese origin in Senegambia, Cabo Verde, Guinea, Sierra Leone, and other areas on the coast of West Africa. Many were Jews—often New Christians—escaping persecution from the Portuguese Inquisition. Lançados often took African wives from local ruling families, securing protection and advantageous trading ties. They established clandestine trading networks in weaponry, spices, and slaves. This black market angered the Portuguese Crown by disrupting its ability to collect taxes.

Although never large in numbers, mixed-race children born to the lançados and their African wives and concubines served as crucial intermediaries between Europeans and native Africans. These mixed-race people wielded significant power in the early development of port economies in Bissau, Cacheu, and surrounding areas.

The lançados originated the Portuguese-based creole languages and cultures of Cabo Verde and Guinea-Bissau, and indirectly influenced the Papiamento language.

History

Origin
At the time of Prince Henry the Navigator's death in 1460, the Portuguese had visited the West African coast from Cabo Verde as far south as the equator. They were familiar with points in between such as Sierra Leone and Elmina (the latter in present-day Ghana). The Portuguese monarchy attempted to hold a total monopoly over the West African slave trade by nominating official intermediaries for that purpose.

In 1479 Portugal and Castile signed the Treaty of Alcáçovas ending the War of the Castilian Succession. During the war Castile had contested the Portuguese slave trade monopoly by threatening Portuguese outposts and unsuccessfully attacking their fleet in the Gulf of Guinea. With their main European rival neutralized, Portugal grew its trade networks and settlements in West Africa essentially unopposed throughout the 15th century. During that century various Portuguese settlers, adventurers, and merchants traveled to the coastal areas and archipelagos of West Africa—particularly Cabo Verde—either voluntarily or by force. Some were merchants or agents of commercial enterprises who "threw themselves" willingly ("lançavam") into contact with African peoples for trading purposes, and often circumvented the Portuguese monarchy's monopolistic taxes. However, the majority of lançados were legally or self-exiled to Africa, including Jews and New Christians escaping the Portuguese Inquisition, and persons called degredados serving out legally-imposed exiles. A very small minority of lançados were not Portuguese, but Spanish, Greek, or Indian.

Lançados would live and trade in coastal areas, either individually or in small groups, and with the knowledge and protection of native Africans. Over time some lançado settlements grew large enough they could impose violence on local peoples without fear of reprisal. The lançados were primarily active on the Senegal, Gambia, Casamance, and Guinea valleys; the Cacheu and Geba River regions in current-day Guinea-Bissau; and in the Port Loko region in current-day Sierra Leone, although they lived as far southwest as Elmina. Perhaps their largest settlements were at Buba and Rio Grande de Buba in present-day Guinea-Bissau.

It was uncommon for male lançados to bring Portuguese or other white women with them to Africa. Instead, they took African wives or concubines, fathering Afro-Portuguese children with them. Some individual lançados lived so long with African people that they integrated into local cultures, abandoning their previous Portuguese identities. Sustained contact between the Portuguese and local African peoples established Portuguese—or at least a proto-creole derived from Portuguese—as a West African lingua franca almost as widespread as the native Mande languages.

The coastal lançados constituted a new sociocultural group that spoke Portuguese, dressed in European clothes, and lived in rectangular Portuguese-style houses with whitewashed walls and verandas, but which also adopted local African customs such as tattooing and scarification. Their religious beliefs were likewise a mix of Catholicism, West African Vodun, and ancestor worship. The strong linguistic and familial ties between the lançados, their descendents, and native people resulted in a distinct Luso-African culture that partially persists into the 21st century.

Peak and decline
The number of lançados grew quickly during the first half of the 16th century in response to the persecution of Jews by Portuguese kings Manuel I and João III. The lançados supported and acted as intermediaries for increasing French, English, and Dutch trading along the West African coast from Cabo Verde to Elmina. In order to combat this trade, the Kingdom of Portugal established fortified trading posts called feitorias at strategic points along the Gulf of Guinea coast.

During the Iberian Union—from the late 16th to early 17th centuries—lançados started trading with the Susu and Mandé peoples, who lived relatively far inland. Throughout the 17th and 18th centuries, lançados and their descendants controlled local commerce in the inland regions of Guinea.

As the quantity of white Portuguese migrants declined from the 17th century onward, lançado descendants with mixed European and African blood began to outnumber Europeans. Towards the end of the 17th century these mulattos or mestiços became a sociocultural elite in the wider Afro-Portuguese community, as they outnumbered both white and black people. During this time they also controlled trade with the Biafada people and the Port Loko region.

The lançados declined in importance starting in the 18th century, when the Portuguese monarchy assumed direct colonial control of coastal areas and began negotiating with indigenous rulers.

Notable Lançados
 Bibiana Vaz (c. 1630 - 1694+)
 Ganagoga (literally, The Man who Speaks all the Languages in Biafada, born João Ferreira) was a lançado New Christian. He was married to a Fula king's daughter in Fuuta Tooro during the sixteenth century, who he also had a child with. Speaking many languages, he was influential among the Fula aristocracy and was close with the lineage head of Casão on the Gambia River.

See also
African Portuguese
Assimilados
Degredados
Luso-Africans
Lusotropicalism
Mestiço
Órfãs do Rei
Pluricontinentalism
Prazeros
Retornados
Signares

References

Notes

Sources

African Christians
African Jews
Portuguese Cape Verde
History of Madeira
History of Senegal
History of the conversos
Jewish Cape Verdean history
Jewish Portuguese history
Jews and Judaism in Madeira
Maritime history of Portugal
Portuguese colonisation in Africa
Portuguese exploration in the Age of Discovery
Portuguese slave traders
Portuguese words and phrases